Villa Hidalgo is a village in Baja California, Mexico.

Climate

References

Cities in Ensenada Municipality